The soft-spined Atlantic spiny-rat (Trinomys dimidiatus) is a spiny rat species from South America. It is endemic to Brazil.

References

Trinomys
Endemic fauna of Brazil
Mammals of Brazil
Rodents of South America
Fauna of the Atlantic Forest
Mammals described in 1877
Taxa named by Albert Günther